Crosby Homes was a major British residential house-building business. It was acquired by Lendlease in 2005.

History
Crosby Homes was established in the mid-1920s by James Crosby to build houses in north Cheshire. During the War it turned to civil engineering and contracting but returned to housebuilding in the late 1950s, when it specialised in building executive housing.
In 1986, the Crosby family sold out to a management team and in 1989 the company was floated on the London Stock Exchange; at that time the company was predominantly building in north Cheshire and south Lancashire. The housing recession led to a cut in the dividend in 1990 and in 1991 Crosby was acquired by Berkeley Group Holdings. The business was substantially expanded, concentrating on city centre development from Birmingham north to Newcastle. As part of Berkeley's restructuring Crosby was sold on deferred terms to its management in 2003; Lendlease then bought it in 2005 for circa £240 million. Shortly after the takeover the company was renamed Crosby Lend Lease.

References

Housebuilding companies of the United Kingdom
Companies based in Birmingham, West Midlands
Lendlease